The 2015 Campeonato Cearense de Futebol was the 101st season of top professional football league in the state of Ceará, Brazil. The competition began on January 14 and ended on May 3. Fortaleza won the championship for the 40th time, while Horizonte and São Benedito were relegated.

Format

The ten teams are split in two groups, who play a double round robin against teams in the same group. The three best in each group advance to the second stage, while the two worst from each group are put in the loser's group.

In the loser's group, the four teams play against each other in a double round-robin, and the two worst are relegated.

In the second stage, the six teams are split in two groups, who play against the other teams in the same group twice. The two best in each group advance to the final stage.

The final stage are playoffs, where the teams are seeded by their performance in the whole championship.

Participating teams

First stage

Group A1

Results

Group A2

Results

Second stage

Group B1

Group B2

Results

Loser's group

Final stage

Semifinals

First leg

Second leg

Finals

References

Cearense
2015